Eric Brown (born 12 September 1990) is a Liberian footballer who plays as an attacking midfielder for Mumbai FC in the I-League.

Career

ONGC
After spending his first professional senior season at Mumbai F.C. Brown signed for ONGC F.C. of the I-League, and made his debut for the club on 26 October 2012 against Prayag United at the Ambedkar Stadium in which he scored the only goal for his team from a free-kick in the 35th minute which led them to a 1–1 draw against the Kolkata club in the I-League.

United Sports Club
Brown was the top scorer for United SC during the 2013-14 I-League.

Pune FC
Brown joined up with Pune F.C. for the 2014-15 I-League.

Mumbai FC
Brown has joined up with Mumbai F.C. for the 2015-16 I-League

Career statistics

Club
Statistics accurate as of 16 January 2015

References

Liberian footballers
1990 births
Living people
I-League players
ONGC FC players
United SC players
Pune FC players
Mumbai FC players
Liberian expatriate footballers
Liberian expatriate sportspeople in India
Expatriate footballers in India
Association football midfielders